Gonzalo Fernández de Córdoba (1453–1515) was a Spanish general and statesman.

Gonzalo Fernández de Córdoba may also refer to:

Gonzalo Fernández de Córdoba (1520–1578), Spanish statesman and governor of Milan
Gonzalo Fernández de Córdoba (1585–1635), Spanish military leader during the Eighty Years' War
Gonzalo Fernández de Córdoba, 9th Duke of Arión, Spanish sailor and Olympian